The Unguarded Hour is a 1935 play by Bernard Merivale, inspired by a Hungarian work by Ladislas Fodor.

It ran for 140 performances in the West End between 31 July and 30 November 1935, originally at Daly's Theatre before transferring first to the Phoenix Theatre and then to the Playhouse. The cast included Godfrey Tearle and Malcolm Keen. In 1939 it was staged at the Pasadena Playhouse.

Adaptation
The following year it was adapted into a Hollywood film The Unguarded Hour  directed by Sam Wood and starring Loretta Young and Franchot Tone.

References

Bibliography

 Goble, Alan. The Complete Index to Literary Sources in Film. Walter de Gruyter, 1999.
 Kabatchnik, Amnon. Blood on the Stage, 1925-1950: Milestone Plays of Crime, Mystery and Detection. Scarecrow Press, 2010.
 Wearing, J.P. The London Stage 1930-1939: A Calendar of Productions, Performers, and Personnel.  Rowman & Littlefield, 2014.

1935 plays
Plays by Bernard Merivale
West End plays
Plays set in London